Samuel Rossiter Betts (June 8, 1786 – November 3, 1868) was an American attorney, politician, and jurist who served as a United States representative from New York and a United States district judge of the United States District Court for the Southern District of New York.

Early life and education

Born on June 8, 1786, in Richmond, Berkshire County, Massachusetts, Betts graduated from Lenox Academy in 1803, and was the first from that institution to attended college. He graduated from Williams College from 1806 and studied law with Thomas P. Grosvenor in Hudson, New York.

Career 
Betts was admitted to the bar in 1809 and entered private practice in Monticello, where he practiced until 1812. He served in the United States Army from 1812 to 1814 appointed as a judge advocate of volunteers during the War of 1812. He was a division judge advocate, General Court Martial, for the New York State Detached Militia starting in 1814.

U.S. House of Representatives 
Betts was elected as a Democratic-Republican from New York's 7th congressional district to the United States House of Representatives of the 14th United States Congress, serving from March 4, 1815, to March 3, 1817. He was not a candidate for renomination in 1816.

Later career 
Following his departure from Congress, Betts resumed private practice in Newburgh, New York, from 1817 to 1823. He was district attorney for Orange County, New York from 1818 to 1820 and again from 1821 to 1823. He was a judge of the Supreme Court of Judicature of New York (now the New York Supreme Court) from 1823 to 1826.

Federal judicial service 
Betts was nominated by President John Quincy Adams on December 19, 1826, to a seat on the United States District Court for the Southern District of New York vacated by Judge William P. Van Ness. He was confirmed by the United States Senate on December 21, 1826, and received his commission the same day. His service terminated on April 30, 1867, due to his resignation.

Together with Supreme Court Justice Joseph Story and Judge Peleg Sprague on the United States District Court for the District of Massachusetts, Betts oversaw, untangled and interpreted the British legacy of admiralty and maritime law in adherence to the American Constitution. He decided numerous prize court cases during the American Civil War.

Betts was the sitting judge for the piracy trial of Charles Gibbs in 1831.

Personal life
Betts married Caroline Abigail Dewey (1798–1882), daughter of Daniel Dewey (1766–1815) and Maria Noble (1770–1813). They had five children.

According to the 1820 U.S. Census, Betts was the owner of two slaves, a female under 14, and a female between 26 and 44. In keeping with New York's gradual emancipation law, under which all slaves were freed by 1827, by the time of the 1830 census, Betts held no slaves.

Betts died on November 3, 1868, in New Haven, Connecticut. He was interred in Woodlawn Cemetery in The Bronx, New York City, New York.

References

External links
 

 

1786 births
1868 deaths
Williams College alumni
Judges of the United States District Court for the Southern District of New York
United States federal judges appointed by John Quincy Adams
19th-century American judges
People from Richmond, Massachusetts
People from Hudson, New York
Politicians from Newburgh, New York
County district attorneys in New York (state)
New York (state) state court judges
Burials at Woodlawn Cemetery (Bronx, New York)
People from Monticello, New York
United States Army personnel
Democratic-Republican Party members of the United States House of Representatives from New York (state)
19th-century American politicians
United States federal judges admitted to the practice of law by reading law